is a Japanese actress, fashion model, and tarento represented by Asia Business Partners.

Biography
Kojima's agency scouted her when she was a sixth-grader in elementary school, while she and her father were selecting an animated video in a rental video store. In September 2006, she became the exclusive model for the first issue of the magazine Nico Puchi. But Kojima later moved to Love Berry.

In April 2007, she made regular appearances as an Oha Girl in Oha Suta along with Nozomi Maeda and Serina Nagano. In April 2008, Kojima made her acting debut in the TV drama Kimi Hannin janai yo ne? as the sister of Shihori Kanjiya's character. 

In 2009, her first leading role in a film was Oppai Volleyball and Kojima later played the sub-protagonist Maria in the television drama Shōkōjo Seira. In 2010, she obtained leading roles in the films Tomehane! Suzuri Kōkō Shodōbu and Shodo Girls that revolve around calligraphy skills. In 2011, Kojima's first leading role in a television drama was Asu no Hikari o Tsukame 2.

Filmography

TV Drama

Films

Stage

Web Drama

Radio Drama

Variety

Other TV Programs

Radio

Advertisements

Music videos

Advertising

Bibliography

Photo Albums

Magazines

Catalogues

References

Notes

External links
 
 

1993 births
Living people
People from Tokyo
21st-century Japanese actresses
Japanese female models
Japanese television personalities
Models from Tokyo Metropolis